is a dam in Suzaka, Nagano Prefecture, Japan. It is located on the Dodo River, immediately downstream from Toyooka Dam.

See also
 List of dams and reservoirs in Japan

Dams in Nagano Prefecture
Gravity dams